Daigō Kenshi (born 23 May 1952 Noburu Itakura) is a former sumo wrestler from Yamamoto, Akita, Japan. He made his professional debut in May 1966 and reached the top division in November 1975. His highest rank was maegashira 11. Upon retirement from active competition he became an elder in the Japan Sumo Association. He was forced to leave the Sumo Association in September 1988, as the Kitajin elder name he was using was needed by the retiring sekiwake Kirinji.

Career record

See also
Glossary of sumo terms
List of past sumo wrestlers
List of sumo tournament second division champions

References

1952 births
Living people
Japanese sumo wrestlers
Sumo people from Akita Prefecture